The Kansas City Royals' season of 2012 was the 44th for the Royals franchise. The Royals hosted the 83rd MLB All-Star Game on July 10 at Kauffman Stadium, where the team played its 40th season of home games. The Royals finished 72–90, 3rd place in the AL Central.

Prior to the 2013 Kansas City Royals season (during the offseason), the Royals donated over $4 million in funds raised during the 2012 All-Star game for various projects in the Kansas City area communities, including building two baseball facilities for disabled children.

Alex Gordon signed a $37.5 million four-year deal with the Royals.

Jeremy Guthrie signed a $25 million three-year deal in November 2012 to stay with the Royals.

Season standings

American League Central

American League Wild Card

Record vs. opponents

Game log

|- bgcolor="ffbbbb"
| 1 || April 6 || @ Angels || 2:22 || 0–5 || Weaver (1–0) || Crow (0–1) ||  || 44,106 || 0–1
|- bgcolor="bbffbb"
| 2 || April 7 || @ Angels || 2:46 || 6–3 || Hochevar (1–0) || Haren (0–1) ||  || 40,022 || 1–1
|- bgcolor="bbffbb"
| 3 || April 8 || @ Angels || 3:15 || 7–3 || Sánchez (1–0) || Santana (0–1) || Broxton (1) || 32,227 || 2–1
|- bgcolor="ffbbbb"
| 4 || April 9 || @ Athletics || 2:34 || 0–1 || Milone (1–0) || Mendoza (0–1) || Balfour (2) || 10,054 || 2–2
|- bgcolor="bbffbb"
| 5 || April 10 || @ Athletics || 2:13 || 3–0 (8) || Duffy (1–0) || Godfrey (0–1) || Crow (1) || 10,670 || 3–2
|- bgcolor="ffbbbb"
| 6 || April 11 || @ Athletics || 4:10 || 4–5 (12) || Carignan (1–1) || Broxton (0–1) || || 12,390 || 3–3
|- bgcolor="ffbbbb"
| 7 || April 13 || Indians || 2:39|| 3–8 || Lowe (2–0) || Hochevar (1–1) ||  || 40,230 || 3–4
|- bgcolor="ffbbbb"
| 8 || April 14 || Indians || 3:44 || 9–11 (10) || Asencio (1–1) || Holland (0–1) || Perez (2) || 21,788 || 3–5
|- bgcolor="ffbbbb"
| 9 || April 15 || Indians || 3:20 || 7–13 || Jiménez (1–0) || Mendoza (0–2) || || 21,182 || 3–6
|- bgcolor="ffbbbb"
| 10 || April 16 || Tigers || 2:37 || 2–3 || Verlander (1–1) || Duffy (1–1) ||  || 14,039 || 3–7
|- bgcolor="ffbbbb"
| 11 || April 17 || Tigers || 2:50 || 1–3 || Dotel (1–0) || Chen (0–1) || Valverde (2) || 13,851 || 3–8
|- bgcolor="ffbbbb"
| 12 || April 18 || Tigers || 3:06 || 3–4 || Scherzer (1–1) || Mijares (0–1) || Valverde (3) || 14,083 || 3–9
|- bgcolor="ffbbbb"
| 13 || April 20 || Blue Jays || 3:14 || 3–4 || Pérez (2–0) || Holland (0–2) || Santos (2) || 23,065 || 3–10
|- bgcolor="ffbbbb"
| 14 || April 21 || Blue Jays || 3:03 || 5–9 || Hutchison (1–0) || Teaford (0–1) || || 27,804 || 3–11
|- bgcolor="ffbbbb"
| 15 || April 22 || Blue Jays || 3:08 || 3–5 || Romero (3–0) || Duffy (1–2) || Cordero (1) || 26,891 || 3–12
|- bgcolor="ffbbbb" 
| 16 || April 23 || Blue Jays || 2:31 || 1–4 || Morrow (1–1) || Chen (0–2) || Cordero (2) || 13,267 || 3–13
|- bgcolor="ffbbbb"
| 17 || April 24 || @ Indians || 3:12 || 3–4 || Lowe (3–1) || Sánchez (1–1)  || Perez (7) || 9,137 || 3–14
|- bgcolor="bbffbb"
| 18 || April 25 || @ Indians || 2:50 || 8–2 || Hochevar (2–1) || Jiménez (2–1) || || 10,552 || 4–14
|- bgcolor="bbffbb"
| 19 || April 26 || @ Indians || 3:00 || 4–2 || Mendoza (1–2) || Tomlin (1–2) || Broxton (2) || 9,229 || 5–14
|- bgcolor="bbffbb"
| 20 || April 27 || @ Twins || 3:00 || 7–6 || Mijares (1–1) || Duensing (0–2) || Broxton (3) || 33,315 || 6–14
|- bgcolor="bbbbbb"
| 21 || April 28 || @ Twins ||colspan=7|Game Postponed (rain) (to be made up as a doubleheader on 6/30)
|- bgcolor="ffbbbb"
| 22 || April 29 || @ Twins || 3:02 || 4–7 || Marquis (2–0) || Chen (0–3) ||  || 34,201 || 6–15
|- bgcolor="bbbbbb"
| 23 || April 30 || @ Tigers ||colspan=7|Game Postponed (rain) (to be made up on 9/24)
|-

|- bgcolor="ffbbbb"
| 24 || May 1 || @ Tigers || 2:27 || 3–9 || Porcello (2–2) || Hochevar (2–2) ||  || 30,159 || 6–16
|- bgcolor="bbffbb"
| 25 || May 2 || @ Tigers || 2:52 || 3–2 || Collins (1–0) || Benoit (0–1) || Broxton (4) || 33,187 || 7–16
|- bgcolor="bbffbb"
| 26 || May 3 || Yankees || 3:20 || 4–3 || Duffy (2–2) || Phelps (0–1) || Broxton (5) || 19,590 || 8–16
|- bgcolor="ffbbbb"
| 27 || May 4 || Yankees || 2:34 || 2–6 || Sabathia (4–0) || Chen (0–4) || || 24,153 || 8–17 
|- bgcolor="bbffbb"
| 28 || May 5 || Yankees || 3:03 || 5–1 || Paulino (1–0) || Kuroda (2–4) ||  || 29,121 || 9–17
|- bgcolor="ffbbbb"
| 29 || May 6 || Yankees || 3:06 || 4–10 || Hughes (2–4) || Hochevar (2–3) ||  || 20,434 || 9–18
|- bgcolor="ffbbbb"
| 30 || May 7 || Red Sox || 3:11 || 5–11 || Doubront (2–1) || Sánchez (1–2) || Padilla (1) || 19,502 || 9–19
|- bgcolor="bbffbb"
| 31 || May 8 || Red Sox || 2:52 || 6–4 || Mijares (2–1) || Bard (2–4) || Broxton (6) || 20,524 || 10–19
|- bgcolor="bbffbb"
| 32 || May 9 || Red Sox || 2:55 || 4–3 || Chen (1–4) || Lester (1–3) || Broxton (7) || 18,339 || 11–19
|- bgcolor="ffbbbb"
| 33 || May 11 || @ White Sox || 2:43 || 0–5 || Floyd (3–3) || Paulino (1–1) ||  || 19,129 || 11–20
|- bgcolor="bbffbb"
| 34 || May 12 || @ White Sox || 2:46 || 5–0 || Hochevar (3–3) || Sale (3–2) ||  || 20,066 || 12–20
|- bgcolor="bbffbb"
| 35 || May 13 || @ White Sox || 3:21 || 9–1 || Mendoza (2–2) || Thornton (1–3) || || 22,636 || 13–20
|- bgcolor="bbffbb"
| 36 || May 14 || @ Rangers || 2:50 || 3–1 || Chen (2–4) || Feldman (0–1) || Broxton (8) || 38,702 || 14–20
|- bgcolor="bbffbb"
| 37 || May 15 || @ Rangers || 2:41 || 7–4 || Mazzaro (1–0) || Lewis (3–3) || || 37,210 || 15–20
|- bgcolor="ffbbbb"
| 38 || May 16 || Orioles || 4:10 || 3–4 (15) || Gregg (1–1) || Adcock (0–1) || Johnson (13) || 17,949 || 15–21
|- bgcolor="ffbbbb"
| 39 || May 17 || Orioles || 2:40 || 3–5 || Matusz (3–4) || Hochevar (3–4)  || Johnson (14) || 31,076 || 15–22
|- bgcolor="ffbbbb"
| 40 || May 18 || Diamondbacks || 3:06 || 4–6 || Ziegler (3–1) || Herrera (0–1) || Putz (8) || 33,694 || 15–23
|- bgcolor="bbffbb"
| 41 || May 19 || Diamondbacks || 2:54 || 7–3 || Chen (3–4) || Kennedy (3–4) || || 27,469 || 16–23
|- bgcolor="ffbbbb"
| 42 || May 20 || Diamondbacks || 2:37 || 0–2 || Miley (5–1) || Adcock (0–2) || Putz (9) || 24,234 || 16–24
|- bgcolor="bbffbb"
| 43 || May 21 || @ Yankees || 3:10 || 6–0 || Paulino (2–1) || Kuroda (3–6) || || 39,229 || 17–24
|- bgcolor="ffbbbb"
| 44 || May 22 || @ Yankees || 2:37 || 2–3 || Hughes (4–5) || Hochevar (3–5) || Soriano (3) || 37,674 || 17–25
|- bgcolor="ffbbbb"
| 45 || May 23 || @ Yankees || 2:53 || 3–8 || Pettitte (2–1) || Smith (0–1) || || 40,407 || 17–26
|- bgcolor="ffbbbb"
| 46 || May 25 || @ Orioles || 3:00 || 2–8 || Hammel (6–1) || Chen (3–5) || || 28,954 || 17–27
|- bgcolor="bbffbb"
| 47 || May 26 || @ Orioles || 3:14 || 4–3 || Holland (1–2) || Strop (3–2) || Broxton (9) || 26,714 || 18–27
|- bgcolor="bbffbb"
| 48 || May 27 || @ Orioles || 3:05 || 4–2 || Collins (2–0) || Matusz (4–5) || Broxton (10) || 33,919 || 19–27
|- bgcolor="ffbbbb"
| 49 || May 28 || @ Indians || 3:01 || 5–8 || Tomlin (2–2) || Adcock (0–3) || Perez (17) || 25,377 || 19–28
|- bgcolor="bbffbb"
| 50 || May 29 || @ Indians || 2:44 || 8–2 || Smith (1–1) || Masterson (2–4) || || 14,253 || 20–28
|- bgcolor="bbffbb"
| 51 || May 30 || @ Indians || 3:28 || 6–3 || Chen (4–5) || Gómez (3–4) || Broxton (11) || 17,112 || 21–28
|-

|- bgcolor="bbffbb"
| 52 || June 1 || Athletics || 2:24 || 2–0 || Paulino (2–1) || Colón (4–6) || Broxton (12) || 29,527 || 22–28
|- bgcolor="ffbbbb"
| 53 || June 2 || Athletics || 3:09 || 3–9 || McCarthy (4–3) || Hochevar (3–6) || || 26,276 || 22–29
|- bgcolor="bbffbb"
| 54 || June 3 || Athletics || 2:37 || 2–0 || Mazzaro (2–0) || Milone (6–5) || Broxton (13) || 21,111 || 23–29
|- bgcolor="ffbbbb"
| 55 || June 4 || Twins || 3:07 || 7–10 || De Vries (1–1) || Smith (1–2) || Capps (13) || 16,531 || 23–30
|- bgcolor="bbffbb"
| 56 || June 5 || Twins || 2:25 || 1–0 || Chen (5–5) || Liriano (1–6) || Broxton (14) || 23,934 || 24–30
|- bgcolor="ffbbbb"
| 57 || June 6 || Twins || 3:04 || 2–4 || Blackburn (2–4) || Mendoza (2–3) || Capps (14) || 18,386 || 24–31
|- bgcolor="ffbbbb"
| 58 || June 8 || @ Pirates || 2:32 || 2–4 || Bédard (4–6) || Hochevar (3–7) || Hanrahan (16) || 36,069 || 24–32
|- bgcolor="ffbbbb"
| 59 || June 9 || @ Pirates || 3:14 || 3–5 || Hughes (2–0) || Mazzaro (2–1) || Hanrahan (17) || 39,312 || 24–33
|- bgcolor="ffbbbb"
| 60 || June 10 || @ Pirates || 2:55 || 2–3 || Burnett (6–2) || Chen (5–6) || Grilli (1) || 25,752 || 24–34
|- bgcolor="bbffbb"
| 61 || June 12 || Brewers || 2:36 || 2–1 || Holland (2–2) || Rodríguez (0–4) || Broxton (15) || 24,258 || 25–34
|- bgcolor="bbffbb"
| 62 || June 13 || Brewers || 3:27 || 4–3 (11) || Collins (3–0) || Loe (2–2) || || 17,885 || 26–34
|- bgcolor="bbffbb"
| 63 || June 14 || Brewers || 2:48 || 4–3 || Collins (4–0) || Axford (1–3) ||  || 21,869 || 27–34
|- bgcolor="bbffbb"
| 64 || June 15 || @ Cardinals || 2:39 || 3–2 || Mazzaro (3–1) || Lohse (6–2) || Broxton (16) || 42,001 || 28–34
|- bgcolor="ffbbbb"
| 65 || June 16 || @ Cardinals || 3:38 || 7–10 || Boggs (1–1) || Collins (4–1) || Motte (14) || 42,018 || 28–35
|- bgcolor="bbffbb"
| 66 || June 17 || @ Cardinals || 5:00 || 5–3 (15) || Broxton (1–1)  || Sánchez (0–1) || || 41,680 || 29–35
|- bgcolor="ffbbbb"
| 67 || June 18 || @ Astros || 3:04 || 7–9 || Happ (5–7) || Sánchez (1–3) || Cedeño (1) || 15,436 || 29–36
|- bgcolor="bbffbb"
| 68 || June 19 || @ Astros || 2:31 || 2–0 || Hochevar (4–7) || Rodríguez (6–5) || Broxton (17) || 18,098 || 30–36
|- bgcolor="bbffbb"
| 69 || June 20 || @ Astros || 2:41 || 2–1 || Chen (6–6) || Lyles (1–4) || Broxton (18) || 30,687 || 31–36
|- bgcolor="ffbbbb"
| 70 || June 22 || Cardinals || 3:05 || 4–11 || Kelly (1–0) || Mazzaro (3–2) || || 37,902 || 31–37
|- bgcolor="ffbbbb"
| 71 || June 23 || Cardinals || 2:58 || 2–8 || Wainwright (6–7) || Mendoza (2–4) || || 37,240 || 31–38
|- bgcolor="ffbbbb"
| 72 || June 24 || Cardinals || 3:08 || 8–11 || Marte (1–1) || Collins (4–2) || || 29,063 || 31–39
|- bgcolor="bbffbb"
| 73 || June 25 || Rays || 2:17 || 8–0 || Hochevar (5–7) || Cobb (3–4) || || 20,200 || 32–39
|- bgcolor="bbffbb"
| 74 || June 26 || Rays || 2:30 || 8–2 || Chen (7–6) || Archer (0–2) || || 25,892 || 33–39
|- bgcolor="bbffbb"
| 75 || June 27 || Rays || 3:01 || 5–4 || Crow (1–1) || Badenhop (1–2) || Broxton (19) || 19,228 || 34–39
|- bgcolor="bbffbb"
| 76 || June 29 || @ Twins || 2:50 || 4–3 || Mendoza (3–4) || Duensing (1–4) || Broxton (20) || 33,359 || 35–39
|- bgcolor="ffbbbb"
| 77 || June 30 || @ Twins || 2:45 || 2–7 || Diamond (7–3) || Sánchez (1–4) || || 37,694 || 35–40
|- bgcolor="ffbbbb"
| 78 || June 30 || @ Twins || 2:43 || 1–5 || De Vries (2–1) || Hochevar (5–8) || || 37,629 || 35–41
|-

|- bgcolor="ffbbbb"
| 78 || July 1 || @ Twins || 3:05 || 8–10 || Gray (4–0) || Chen (7–7) || || 37,819 || 35–42
|- bgcolor="bbffbb"
| 79 || July 2 || @ Blue Jays || 2:36 || 11–3 || Teaford (1–1) || Romero (8–3) || || 17,127 || 36–42
|- bgcolor="ffbbbb"
| 80 || July 3 || @ Blue Jays || 2:30 || 3–6 || Cecil (2–1) || Mazzaro (3–3) || Janssen (10) || 15,516 || 36–43
|- bgcolor="ffbbbb"
| 81 || July 4 || @ Blue Jays || 2:45 || 1–4 || Villanueva (3–0) || Mendoza (3–5) || Janssen (11) || 17,831 || 36–44
|- bgcolor="bbffbb"
| 82 || July 5 || @ Blue Jays || 3:16 || 9–6 || Hochevar (6–8) || Álvarez (5–7) || Broxton (21) || 20,598 || 37–44
|- bgcolor="ffbbbb"
| 83 || July 6 || @ Tigers || 2:56 || 2–4 || Smyly (4–3) || Sánchez (1–5) || Valverde (16) || 39,144 || 37–45
|- bgcolor="ffbbbb"
| 84 || July 7 || @ Tigers || 3:00 || 7–8 || Fister (2–6) || Chen (7–8) || || 39,392 || 37–46
|- bgcolor="ffbbbb"
| 85 || July 8 || @ Tigers || 2:41 || 1–7 || Scherzer (8–5) || Teaford (1–2) || || 36,693 || 37–47
|- bgcolor="ffbbbb"
| 86 || July 13 || White Sox || 5:23 || 8–9 (14) || Axelrod (1–2) || Teaford (1–3) || || 32,744 || 37–48
|- bgcolor="bbffbb"
| 87 || July 14 || White Sox || 2:56 || 6–3 || Holland (3–2) || Peavy (7–6) || Broxton (22) || 24,998 || 38–48
|- bgcolor="ffbbbb"
| 88 || July 15 || White Sox || 2:52 || 1–2 || Sale (11–2) || Mendoza (3–6) || Reed (14) || 25,714 || 38–49
|- bgcolor="ffbbbb"
| 89 || July 16 || Mariners || 2:59 || 4–9 || Vargas (9–7) || Sánchez (1–6) || || 16,697 || 38–50
|- bgcolor="ffbbbb"
| 90 || July 17 || Mariners || 3:09 || 6–9 || Beavan (4–6) || Verdugo (0–1) || Wilhelmsen (8) || 15,769 || 38–51
|- bgcolor="bbffbb"
| 91 || July 18 || Mariners || 3:03 || 8–7 || Holland (4–2) || Kinney (0–1) || || 17,312 || 39–51
|- bgcolor="ffbbbb"
| 92 || July 19 || Mariners || 2:31 || 1–6 || Hernández (8–5) || Smith (1–3) || || 16,706 || 39–52
|- bgcolor="ffbbbb"
| 93 || July 20 || Twins || 3:23 || 1–2 (11) || Fien (1–0) || Broxton (1–2) || Perkins (5) || 25,719 || 39–53
|- bgcolor="bbffbb"
| 94 || July 21 || Twins || 3:02 || 7–3 || Mendoza (4–6) || Diamond (8–4) || Crow (2) || 26,747 || 40–53
|- bgcolor="ffbbbb"
| 95 || July 22 || Twins || 2:47 ||  5–7 || Deduno (1–0) || Guthrie (3–10) || || 23,252 || 40–54
|- bgcolor="ffbbbb"
| 96 || July 23 || @ Angels || 3:21 || 3–6 || Jepsen (1–1) || Holland (4–3) || Downs (9) || 35,047 || 40–55
|- bgcolor="bbffbb"
| 97 || July 24 || @ Angels || 2:54 || 4–1 || Smith (2–3) || Richards (3–2) || Broxton (23) || 35,051 || 41–55
|- bgcolor="ffbbbb"
| 98 || July 25 || @ Angels || 3:07 || 6–11 || Weaver (13–1) || Hochevar (6–9) || || 39,107 || 41–56
|- bgcolor="ffbbbb"
| 99 || July 26 || @ Mariners || 2:31 || 1–4 || Vargas (11–7) || Mendoza (4–7) || Wilhelmsen (12) || 15,014 || 41–57
|- bgcolor="ffbbbb"
| 100 || July 27 || @ Mariners || 2:30 || 1–6 || Beavan (6–6) || Guthrie (3–11) || || 14,953 || 41–58
|- bgcolor="ffbbbb"
| 101 || July 28 || @ Mariners || 2:42 || 3–4 || Millwood (4–8) || Chen (7–9) || Wilhelmsen (13) || 32,111 || 41–59
|- bgcolor="ffbbbb"
| 102 || July 29 || @ Mariners || 3:00 || 6–7 || Pérez (1–2) || Mijares (2–2) || Wilhelmsen (14) || 19,402 || 41–60
|- bgcolor="bbffbb"
| 103 || July 31 || Indians || 2:46 || 8–3 || Hochevar (7–9) || Lowe (8–10) || || 18,569 || 42–60
|-

|- bgcolor="bbffbb"
| 104 || August 1 || Indians || 2:31 || 5–2 || Mendoza (5–7) || McAllister (4–3) || Holland (1) || 17,033 || 43–60
|- bgcolor="bbffbb"
| 105 || August 2 || Indians || 3:41 || 7–6 (11) || Crow (2–1) || Rogers (1–3) || || 15,135 || 44–60
|- bgcolor="ffbbbb"
| 106 || August 3 || Rangers || 2:58 || 3–5 || Harrison (13–6) || Guthrie (3–12) || Ogando (2) || 26,889 || 44–61
|- bgcolor="ffbbbb"
| 107 || August 4 || Rangers || 2:41 || 2–4 || Feldman (6–6) || Smith (2–4) || Ogando (3) || 28,724 || 44–62
|- bgcolor="bbffbb"
| 108 || August 5 || Rangers || 3:26 || 7–6 (10) || Holland (5–3) || Kirkman (0–2) || || 22,007 || 45–62
|- bgcolor="ffbbbb"
| 109 || August 6 || @ White Sox || 2:17 || 2–4 || Sale (13–3) || Mendoza (5–8) || Reed (20) || 30,097 || 45–63
|- bgcolor="bbffbb"
| 110 || August 7 || @ White Sox || 2:34 || 5–2 || Chen (8–9) || Peavy (9–8) || Holland (2) || 27,194 || 46–63
|- bgcolor="bbffbb"
| 111 || August 8 || @ White Sox || 2:37 || 2–1 || Guthrie (4–12) || Quintana (4–2) || Holland (3) || 25,151 || 47–63
|- bgcolor="bbffbb"
| 112 || August 9 || @ Orioles || 2:40 || 8–2 || Smith (3–4) || Chen (10–7) || || 21,226 || 48–63
|- bgcolor="ffbbbb"
| 113 || August 10 || @ Orioles || 2:31 || 1–7 || González (4–2) || Hochevar (7–10) || || 17,277 || 48–64
|- bgcolor="bbffbb"
| 114 || August 11 || @ Orioles || 2:59 || 7–3 || Mendoza (6–8) || Tillman (5–2) || || 40,456 || 49–64
|- bgcolor="ffbbbb"
| 115 || August 12 || @ Orioles || 2:44 || 3–5 || Ayala (4–3) || Chen (8–10) || Johnson (34) || 20,935 || 49–65
|- bgcolor="bbffbb"
| 116 || August 14 || Athletics || 2:23 || 5–0 || Guthrie (5–12) || Parker (7–7) || || 16,107 || 50–65
|- bgcolor="bbffbb" 
| 117 || August 15 || Athletics || 2:35 || 3–2 || Smith (4–4) || McCarthy (6–4) || Holland (4) || 15,591 || 51–65  
|- bgcolor="ffbbbb"
| 118 || August 16 || Athletics || 2:57 || 0–3 || Straily (1–0) || Hochevar (7–11) || Balfour (9) || 14,345 || 51–66
|- bgcolor="bbffbb" 
| 119 || August 17 || White Sox || 2:31 || 4–2 || Mendoza (7–8) || Sale (14–4) || Holland (5) || 22,169 || 52–66
|- bgcolor="bbffbb"
| 120 || August 18 || White Sox || 2:59 || 9–4 || Chen (9–10) || Peavy (9–9) || || 23,858 || 53–66
|- bgcolor="bbffbb"
| 121 || August 19 || White Sox || 2:43 || 5–2 || Holland (6–3) || Crain (2–2) || || 22,401 || 54–66
|- bgcolor="ffbbbb"
| 122 || August 20 || @ Rays || 2:46 || 1–5 || Hellickson (8–8) || Smith (4–5) || || 9,913 || 54–67
|- bgcolor="bbffbb"
| 123 || August 21 || @ Rays || 2:46 || 1–0 (10) || Herrera (1–1) || Peralta (1–5) || Holland (6) || 10,877 || 55–67
|- bgcolor="ffbbbb"
| 124 || August 22 || @ Rays || 2:54 || 3–5 || Shields (12–7) || Mendoza (7–9) || Rodney (39) || 11,892 || 55–68
|- bgcolor="ffbbbb"
| 125 || August 24 || @ Red Sox || 2:54 || 3–4 || Lester (8–10) || Herrera (1–2) || Bailey (1) || 37,228 || 55–69
|- bgcolor="bbffbb"
| 126 || August 25 || @ Red Sox || 4:31 || 10–9 (12) || Bueno (1–0) || Tazawa (0–1) || Holland (7) || 37,103 || 56–69
|- bgcolor="ffbbbb"
| 127 || August 26 || @ Red Sox || 3:36 || 6–8 || Beato (1–0) || Smith (4–6) || Melancon (1) || 37,188 || 56–70
|- bgcolor="ffbbbb"
| 128 || August 27 || @ Red Sox || 2:34 || 1–5 || Matsuzaka (1–3) || Hochevar (7–12) || || 37,506 || 56–71
|- bgcolor="bbffbb"
| 129 || August 28 || Tigers || 3:30 || 9–8 || Crow (3–1) || Villarreal (3–4) || Holland (8) || 13,601 || 57–71
|- bgcolor="bbffbb"
| 130 || August 29 || Tigers || 2:25 || 1–0 || Chen (10–10) || Sánchez (7–11) || Holland (9) || 13,024 || 58–71
|- bgcolor="bbffbb"
| 131 || August 30 || Tigers || 2:41 || 2–1 || Guthrie (6–12) || Porcello (9–10) || Herrera (1) || 12,997 || 59–71
|- bgcolor="bbbbbb"
| 132 || August 31 || Twins ||colspan=7|Game Postponed (rain) (to be made up as a doubleheader on 9/1)
|-

|- bgcolor="ffbbbb"
| 132 || September 1 || Twins || 2:31 || 1–3 || De Vries (4–5) || Smith (4–7) || Perkins (9) || || 59–72
|- bgcolor="ffbbbb"
| 133 || September 1 || Twins || 3:07 || 7–8 || Swarzak (3–4) || Hochevar (7–13) || Perkins (10) || 23,189 || 59–73
|- bgcolor="bbffbb"
| 134 || September 2 || Twins || 2:55 || 6–4 || Collins (5–2) || Vásquez (0–1) || Holland (10) || 23,641 || 60–73
|- bgcolor="ffbbbb"
| 135 || September 3 || Rangers || 2:40 || 4–8 || Darvish (14–9) || Chen (10–11) || || 22,207 || 60–74
|- bgcolor="bbffbb"
| 136 || September 4 || Rangers || 2:32 || 6–3 || Guthrie (7–12) || Harrison (15–9) || Holland (11) || 12,462 || 61–74
|- bgcolor="ffbbbb"
| 137 || September 5 || Rangers || 2:58 || 6–7 || Dempster (10–6) || Teaford (1–4) || Nathan (29) || 13,354 || 61–75
|- bgcolor="ffbbbb"
| 138 || September 6 || Rangers || 3:20 || 4–5 (10) || Adams (4–3) || Holland (6–4) || Nathan (30) || 15,332 || 61–76
|- bgcolor="bbffbb"
| 139 || September 7 || @ White Sox || 3:02 || 7–5 || Herrera (2–2) || Reed (3–2) || Holland (12) || 26,660 || 62–76
|- bgcolor="ffbbbb"
| 140 || September 8 || @ White Sox || 2:48 || 4–5 || Sale (16–6) || Chen (10–12) || Reed (26) || 26,227 || 62–77
|- bgcolor="bbffbb"
| 141 || September 9 || @ White Sox || 3:30 || 2–1 (10) || Herrera (3–2) || Myers (2–7) || Holland (13) || 19,356 || 63–77
|- bgcolor="bbffbb"
| 142 || September 11 || @ Twins || 2:56 || 9–1 || Smith (5–7) || Diamond (11–7) || || 28,993 || 64–77
|- bgcolor="bbffbb"
| 143 || September 12 || @ Twins || 3:25 || 10–5 || Hochevar (8–13) || Walters (2–4) || || 28,139 || 65–77
|- bgcolor="ffbbbb"
| 143 || September 13 || @ Twins || 3:13 || 3–4 (10) || Perkins (3–1) || Bueno (1–1) || || 28,669 || 65–78
|- bgcolor="ffbbbb"
| 145 || September 14 || Angels || 3:42 || 7–9 || Walden (3–2) || Collins (5–3) || Frieri (19) || 27,586 || 65–79
|- bgcolor="bbffbb"
| 146 || September 15 || Angels || 2:23 || 3–2 || Herrera (4–2) || Frieri (4–1) || || 23,027 || 66–79
|- bgcolor="ffbbbb"
| 147 || September 16 || Angels || 2:43 || 3–4 || Haren (11–11) || Smith (5–8) || Jepsen (2) || 24,979 || 66–80
|- bgcolor="ffbbbb"
| 148 || September 18 || White Sox || 2:12 || 2–3 || Floyd (10–10) || Hochevar (8–14) || Reed (28) || 14,420 || 66–81
|- bgcolor="bbffbb"
| 149 || September 19 || White Sox || 2:51 || 3–0 || Chen (11–12) || Sale (17–7) || Holland (14) || 15,120 || 67–81
|- bgcolor="bbffbb"
| 150 || September 20 || White Sox || 2:41 || 4–3 || Holland (7–4) || Crain (2–3) || || 14,710 || 68–81
|- bgcolor="bbffbb"
| 151 || September 21 || Indians || 2:41 || 6–3 || Mendoza (8–9) || Masterson (11–15) || Holland (15) || 22,805 || 69–81
|- bgcolor="bbffbb"
| 152 || September 22 || Indians || 2:47 || 5–3 || Smith (6–8) || Jiménez (9–17) || Herrera (2) || 24,304 || 70–81
|- bgcolor="ffbbbb"
| 153 || September 23 || Indians || 3:17 || 4–15 || Huff (2–0) || Odorizzi (0–1) || || 22,960 || 70–82
|- bgcolor="ffbbbb"
| 154 || September 24 || @ Tigers || 2:34 || 2–6 || Verlander (16–8) || Hochevar (8–15) || || 31,521 || 70–83
|- bgcolor="ffbbbb"
| 155 || September 25 || @ Tigers || 2:13 || 0–2 || Sánchez (9–13) || Chen (11–13) || || 29,048 || 70–84
|- bgcolor="ffbbbb"
| 156 || September 26 || @ Tigers || 2:39 || 4–5 || Benoit (4–3) || Herrera (4–3) || Valverde (32) || 32,360 || 70–85
|- bgcolor="ffbbbb"
| 156 || September 27 || @ Tigers || 2:33 || 4–5 || Benoit (5–3) || Collins (5–4) || || 33,019 || 70–86
|- bgcolor="ffbbbb"
| 157 || September 28 || @ Indians || 3:00 || 5–8 || Huff (3–0) || Smith (6–9) || Perez (39) || 14,850 || 70–87
|- bgcolor="bbffbb"
| 158 || September 29 || @ Indians || 4:52 || 7–6 (14) || Mazzaro (4–3) || Maine (2–3) || Herrera (3) || 17,109 || 71–87
|- bgcolor="ffbbbb"
| 159 || September 30 || @ Indians || 3:02 || 3–15 || McAllister (6–8) || Hochevar (8–16) || || 18,099 || 71–88
|- bgcolor="ffbbbb"
| 160 || October 1 || Tigers || 2:55 || 3–6 || Porcello (10–12) || Chen (11–14) || Valverde (35) || 15,312 || 71–89
|- bgcolor="bbffbb"
| 161 || October 2 || Tigers || 2:34 || 4–2 || Guthrie (8–12) || Fister (10–10) || Holland (16) || 14,283 || 72–89
|- bgcolor="ffbbbb"
| 162 || October 3 || Tigers || 7:10 || 0-1 ||  Marte (1-0)|| Mendoza (8-10) ||  Putkonen (1) || 30,383  ||72-90
|-

Roster

Farm system

References
Kansas City Royals: Official web site

External links
2012 Kansas City Royals Official Site
2012 Kansas City Royals at Baseball Reference

Kansas City Royals
Kansas City Royals seasons
2012 in sports in Missouri